Intake Cemetery is one of the city of Sheffield's many cemeteries. The cemetery features a Grade II listed chapel which was designed by Innocent and Brown.

The cemetery features a number of Commonwealth War Graves, including 21 casualties of the Second World War and 4 casualties from the First World War.

The cemetery took its name from the earlier City Road Cemetery which was originally known as Intake Road Cemetery.

References

External links
 

Cemeteries in England
Grade II listed buildings in Sheffield
1880 establishments in England
Commonwealth War Graves Commission cemeteries in England
Grade II listed churches in South Yorkshire